Augustin Grisolle (10 February 1811 – 9 February 1869) was a French physician born in Fréjus.

Grisolle was a professor at the Paris faculty of medicine and a member of the Académie de Médecine. He was the author of the two-volume "Traité élémentaire et pratique de pathologie interne" (1844).

His name is associated with "Grisolle's sign", an obsolete sign once affiliated with smallpox. It involved feeling the presence of papules when the skin is stretched.

Selected writings 
 Mémoire sur la pneumonie, 1836 (Treatise on pneumonia).
 Histoire des tumeurs phlegmoneuses des fosses iliaques, 1839 (History of phlegmonous iliac fossa tumors).
 Traité élémentaire et pratique de pathologie interne, 1844 (Treatise on internal pathology); seventh edition 1857. 
 Discours prononcé au nom de la Faculté de médecine de Paris le 12 avril 1858 sur la tombe de M. Chomel 1858 (Speech on behalf of the Faculty of Medicine in Paris on April 12, 1858, at the grave of Auguste François Chomel 1788–1858).

Notes

References 
 Faj-Rues de Frejus Biographical Information (French)
 Eponyms & Syndromes, Dermatology Facts

People from Var (department)
1811 births
People from Fréjus
1869 deaths
19th-century French physicians